Burnhope is a village and civil parish in County Durham, England. It is located in the Craghead valley on the opposite side to Stanley and has 1,564 inhabitants, as measured in the 2011 census.   Burnhope overlooks Lanchester in the Browney Valley, roughly two miles to the west and Maiden Law is roughly two miles north.   Holmside is roughly two miles to the south east.

The village
Burnhope is a village of contrasts, being home to many of the area's poorest and richest people (among them, children's author Terry Deary). In 2003 two wind turbines were erected in a field between the village and nearby Craghead, creating a new landmark to accompany the transmission mast. Burnhope is the only place that the Durham Miners' Gala has been held apart from Durham. This was in 1926 the year of the General Strike when it was banned at Durham so it was moved to Burnhope. In 1986 a 60th anniversary was held to mark this event. 

The school was run in 1921 by William Jacques Warwick, with his wife Emmeline teaching in the Infants Department.

Burnhope has increased in size rapidly within the last few years with over 120 new homes being built by developer, Keepmoat Homes.

Langley Hall 

Two miles south-east are the ruins of Langley Hall, a 16th-century fortified manor house.

References

External links
Burnhope Transmission Mast
 Burnhope Waggonway
Burnhope Colliery
Burnhope Flatts Farm
Stone Circle "Gardner's Crop"
Burnhope Transmitter at thebigtower.com

Villages in County Durham